South Dakota Dept. of Transportation Bridge No. 49-095-190 is a historic bridge in rural Miner County, South Dakota. Built in 1917, it is the longest pre-1920 concrete slab bridge in the state. Bridges from this time predate the standardization in the methods and use of concrete in bridge construction, and are relatively rare. The bridge consists of a single span  in length, with a solid concrete parapet as a railing. The concrete is suffering from spalling.

The bridge was listed on the National Register of Historic Places in 1993.

See also
List of bridges on the National Register of Historic Places in South Dakota

References

Road bridges on the National Register of Historic Places in South Dakota
Bridges completed in 1917
Buildings and structures in Miner County, South Dakota
National Register of Historic Places in Miner County, South Dakota
Concrete bridges in the United States